Alfred Denison Pearce (8 April 1896 – 3 July 1968) was a British fencer. He competed at the 1928 and 1936 Summer Olympics. In 1927, he won the foil title at the British Fencing Championships.

References

1896 births
1968 deaths
British male fencers
Olympic fencers of Great Britain
Fencers at the 1928 Summer Olympics
Fencers at the 1936 Summer Olympics
Sportspeople from Birmingham, West Midlands